Mairesse is a surname. Notable people with the surname include:
 Guy Mairesse (1910–1954), French racing driver
 Jacques Mairesse (footballer) (1905–1940), French footballer
 Jacques Mairesse (economist) (born 1940), French economist
 Valérie Mairesse (born 1955), French actress
 Willy Mairesse (1928–1969), Belgian racing driver

French-language surnames